Harry K Jackson (born 26 May 1941) is a retired British cyclist. He competed at the 1964 Summer Olympics and the 1968 Summer Olympics.

He also represented England and won a bronze medal in the 4,000 metres individual pursuit at the 1962 British Empire and Commonwealth Games in Perth, Western Australia. He also participated in the 10 miles scratch and 1 km time trial events.

Four years later he represented England in the pursuit again but finished in fourth place, at the 1966 British Empire and Commonwealth Games in Kingston, Jamaica.

References

External links
 

1941 births
Living people
British male cyclists
Olympic cyclists of Great Britain
Cyclists at the 1964 Summer Olympics
Cyclists at the 1968 Summer Olympics
Commonwealth Games medallists in cycling
Commonwealth Games bronze medallists for England
Cyclists at the 1962 British Empire and Commonwealth Games
Cyclists at the 1966 British Empire and Commonwealth Games
20th-century British people
Medallists at the 1962 British Empire and Commonwealth Games